Nancy Elaine Achin Sullivan (January 20, 1959 – February 25, 2022) was an American Republican politician from Lowell, Massachusetts. She represented the 1st Middlesex district in the Massachusetts Senate from 1991 to 1993 and was a Democrat. She retired after a single term because she was undergoing chemotherapy to treat breast cancer.

Sullivan was born in Lowell, Massachusetts, on January 20, 1959. A four-time cancer survivor, she served as executive director of the Massachusetts Board of Registration in Medicine from 1999 until 2008. Sullivan went to the Academy of Notre Dame in Lowell, Massachusetts and to Radcliffe College. She died in Andover, Massachusetts, on February 25, 2022, at the age of 63.

See also
 1991-1992 Massachusetts legislature

References

1959 births
2022 deaths
20th-century American women politicians
20th-century American politicians
Democratic Party Massachusetts state senators
Politicians from Lowell, Massachusetts
Radcliffe College alumni
Women state legislators in Massachusetts